Paige L. Sweet (born 1987) is a sociologist at the University of Michigan, where she studies gaslighting in relationships and in the workplace. She is the author of The Politics of Surviving: How Women Navigate Domestic Violence and Its Aftermath (University of California Press, 2021).

Career
In 2018, Sweet received her PhD in Sociology from the University of Illinois Chicago.

Sweet is the author of the article “The Sociology of Gaslighting” published in the American Sociological Review (2019), for which she received an award from the American Sociological Association. She has written the book The Politics of Surviving: How Women Navigate Domestic Violence and its Aftermath (2021).

As of 2020, she teaches at the University of Michigan, where she studies gaslighting in relationships and in the workplace. She argues that gaslighting is mostly a sociological phenomenon made possible by social inequalities, including gender. She has related gaslighting to sexual situations, medicine, the legal system, and to the work place.

Selected publications

Articles

Books

References

Further reading
Sweet, Paige L. (2021). Curriculum Vitae. LSA Sociology. University of Michigan

External links 
 

1987 births
Living people
21st-century American non-fiction writers
University of Michigan
American sociologists
American women sociologists